Officially the Physics and Mathematics Specialized School named after Artashes  Shahinyan under the Yerevan State University, colloquially known as PhysMath School, is a state-owned high school located in Yerevan, Armenia. It is currently among the leading educational complexes in Yerevan. The school has a branch in Stepanakert; the capital of the unrecognized state of Artsakh.

Overview
The PhysMath School was founded in 1965 in affiliation with the Yerevan State University and through the efforts of professor Artashes Shahinyan. Following the death of Shahinyan in 1978, the school was named after him.

The school is known for its role in preparing physics and mathematics teachers. It was ranked 1st in Armenia for the 2013-14 educational year. 

The current headmaster of the school is Armen Sargsyan, serving since 2002.

References

External links
 Official website

Education in Yerevan
Schools in Armenia
Schools in the Soviet Union
1965 establishments in the Soviet Union